The Institute of Buddhist Studies is a Jodo Shinshu-affiliated seminary and graduate school, located in Berkeley, California. It is a member school of the Graduate Theological Union, also located in Berkeley. Its mission is to provide graduate level education in the entirety of the Buddhist tradition with specialization in Jodo Shinshu ministry and Buddhist chaplains. It is the sole seminary for ministers serving temples in the United States through the Buddhist Churches of America, the U.S. mainland branch district of the Nishi Hongwanji sect of Japanese Buddhism.

History
Following the incarceration of Japanese Americans during World War II, nisei ("second generation") Buddhists in California desired to create an educational program for American-born ministers or priests. Supported by the Buddhist Churches of America, a study program was established in 1949 at the Berkeley Buddhist Temple and overseen by Rev. Kanmo Imamura and his wife Jane. Prior to this, all US ministers were educated and trained in Japan.

In 1966, the BCA purchased a building in Berkeley to house the study center. With support of BCA Bishops Shinsho Hanayama and Kenryu Tsuji, the IBS incorporated with the State of California as a graduate school and seminary in 1969.

Under the direction of Bishop Seigen Yamaoka, in 1985 IBS became an affiliate of the Graduate Theological Union. In 2021, the GTU accepted IBS as a full member school, the first non-Christian seminary to be a member school.

Under the leadership of President David Matsumoto and Dean Scott Mitchell, IBS was granted accreditation by the Western Association of Schools and Colleges in 2020.

Educational Programs
The Institute of Buddhist Studies offers three graduate degree programs:
 Master of Arts in Buddhist Studies (M.A.B.S.)
 Master of Divinity (M.Div.)
 Master of Arts (M.A.) with a concentration in Buddhist Studies jointly offered with the Graduate Theological Union

The Institute of Buddhist Studies also offers six certificate programs which may be completed concurrently within a degree program to focus one’s studies and certify competence in a particular field of study, or may be completed as stand-alone programs:

 Certificate in Buddhist Studies (online)
 Certificate in Shin Buddhist Studies (online)
 Certificate in Sōtō Zen Buddhist Studies (online)
 Certificate in Theravada Buddhist Studies
 Certificate in Buddhist Chaplaincy
 Certificate in Buddhism and Contemporary Psychology

Publications
The Institute of Buddhist Studies publishes an academic journal, the Pacific World, and has partnered with several other organizations to produce journals and book series:

 Pacific World: Journal of Institute of Buddhist Studies
 Contemporary Issues in Buddhist Studies book series
 Pure Land Buddhist Studies book series
 The Pure Land: Journal of the International Association of Shin Buddhist Studies
 The Buddhist Forum
 The Journal of Buddhist Literature
 IBS Monograph Series
 Publications of the Center for Contemporary Shin Buddhist Studies

References

External links
 Institute of Buddhist Studies

Jōdo Shinshū
Graduate Theological Union
Buddhist universities and colleges in the United States
Educational institutions established in 1949
1949 establishments in California
Buddhism in California